John Joseph Santucci (April 2, 1931 – June 26, 2016) was an American lawyer and politician.

Life
The son of Italian immigrant parents, Santucci was born on April 2, 1931, in Ozone Park, Queens, New York City. He attended Public Schools No. 123 and 155, and John Adams High School. He graduated from St. John's University, and in 1953 from St. John's University School of Law. He practiced law in New York City, and entered politics as a Democrat.

On April 14, 1964, Santucci was co-opted to the New York City Council (6th D.), to fill the vacancy caused by the appointment of Eric J. Treulich to the New York City Civil Court.

On February 20, 1968, Santucci was elected to the New York State Senate, to fill the vacancy caused by the election of Irving Mosberg to the New York City Civil Court. He remained in the Senate until 1976, sitting in the 177th, 178th, 179th, 180th, and 181st New York State Legislatures. He was re-elected in November 1976, but resigned his seat before the next Legislature met.

On December 30, 1976, Santucci was appointed as District Attorney of Queens County, to fill the vacancy caused by the election of Nicholas Ferraro to the New York Supreme Court. In November 1977, Santucci was elected to succeed himself, defeating anti-corruption crusader Maurice H. Nadjari. In 1980, Santucci ran in the Democratic primary for the U.S. Senate seat held by Jacob K. Javits but was defeated by U.S. Representative Elizabeth Holtzman. Santucci was re-elected as D.A. in 1981, 1985, and 1989. He tendered his resignation on May 1, 1991, to take effect on June 1. He died aged 85 at Winthrop-University Hospital on June 26, 2016 after going into cardiac arrest at his home in Garden City, New York.

References

1931 births
2016 deaths
People from Ozone Park, Queens
Democratic Party New York (state) state senators
St. John's University School of Law alumni
Queens County (New York) District Attorneys
New York City Council members
20th-century American lawyers
20th-century American politicians
John Adams High School (Queens) alumni
American people of Italian descent